John Miliades (Ioannis Miliades, Γιάννης Μηλιάδης, Ιωάννης Μηλιάδης) (1895-1975) was a Greek archaeologist most known for his excavations of the south side of the Acropolis of Athens.

References

Archaeologists from Athens
1895 births
Year of death missing